Gisela Mauermayer (24 November 1913 in Munich – 9 January 1995 in Munich) was a German athlete who competed mainly in the discus. She won the gold medal at the 1936 Summer Olympics held in Berlin, Germany.

1913 births
1995 deaths
German female discus throwers
Athletes (track and field) at the 1936 Summer Olympics
Olympic athletes of Germany
Olympic gold medalists for Germany
Sportspeople from Munich
World record setters in athletics (track and field)
European Athletics Championships medalists
Medalists at the 1936 Summer Olympics
Olympic gold medalists in athletics (track and field)
Women's World Games medalists
German female shot putters
Nazi Party members
20th-century German women